Moving to Mars can refer to:
"Moving to Mars" (song), a Coldplay song from the Every Teardrop is a Waterfall EP
Moving to Mars (film), a documentary film about a Burmese family seeking refuge in the United Kingdom